If I'm Lucky may refer to:
If I'm Lucky (film), 1946
If I'm Lucky (album), 1977 album by Zoot Sims and Jimmy Rowles
"If I'm Lucky" (song), 2017 song by Jason Derulo